Nate Hawthorne (January 19, 1951 – November 23, 2005) was an American former professional basketball player. He spent three seasons in the National Basketball Association (NBA), one with the Los Angeles Lakers (1973–74) and two with the Phoenix Suns (1974–76). The Mount Vernon, Illinois, native attended Southern Illinois University prior to his NBA stint. He died at the age of 54 outside his home in Tempe, Arizona, suffering a massive heart attack.

References

1951 births
2005 deaths
African-American basketball players
American men's basketball players
Basketball players from Illinois
Los Angeles Lakers draft picks
Los Angeles Lakers players
New Orleans Jazz expansion draft picks
People from Mount Vernon, Illinois
Phoenix Suns players
Shooting guards
Southern Illinois Salukis men's basketball players
20th-century African-American sportspeople
21st-century African-American people